Nyctemera cenis is a species of moth in the family Erebidae. It was  first described by Pieter Cramer in 1777 and is found in China (Zhejiang, Yunnan), Taiwan, Japan (Ryukyu Islands), the north-western Himalayas, north-eastern India and Myanmar.

References

Nyctemerina
Moths described in 1777